Châtel-de-Neuvre is a commune in the Allier department in central France.

Population

See also
Communes of the Allier department

References

Communes of Allier
Allier communes articles needing translation from French Wikipedia